Secretariat may refer to:
 Secretariat (administrative office)
 Secretariat (horse), a racehorse that won the Triple Crown in 1973
 Secretariat (film), a 2010 film about the racehorse
 Secretariat, a pantomime horse based on the racehorse that appeared on The Late Late Show with Craig Ferguson

See also